Oxalicibacterium solurbis is a  Gram-negative, rod-shaped, and aerobic bacterium from the genus Oxalicibacterium and family Oxalobacteraceae.

References

External links
Type strain of Oxalicibacterium solurbis at BacDive -  the Bacterial Diversity Metadatabase

Burkholderiales
Bacteria described in 2010